SquareTrade Inc. is an American extended warranty service provider for consumer electronics and appliances headquartered in San Francisco's SoMa district.

Dispute resolution services 

Co-founded in 1999 by Steve Abernethy and Ahmed Khaishgi, SquareTrade launched as the first online service for resolving e-commerce disputes. Working with online marketplaces such as eBay, the company utilized an online negotiation tool to automate the dispute resolution process between sellers and buyers. Between 1999 and 2001, SquareTrade raised $15M from JP Morgan Partners, Weston Presidio Capital and Draper Richards. That same year, the company launched a merchant-verification service, the SquareTrade Seal.  Both original services have since been discontinued.

Warranty services 

In 2006, SquareTrade began providing consumer protection plans for portable devices, appliances, and other electronics, both on-line and through large retailers. PC Magazine listed it as number 93 in its list of the best 100 web sites of the year. In 2012, Bain Capital and Bain Capital Ventures announced they were investing $238 million in the company, marking the second largest venture capital deal of the year.

The company's underwriter has been AmTrust Financial Services, Inc., but as of 2013, SquareTrade was shifting toward Starr Indemnity.

SquareTrade was acquired by Allstate in late 2016, for $1.4 billion, joining Allstate's suite of consumer asset protection services.

Lawsuit 
A class action law-suit was filed late 2016 against SquareTrade for selling protection plans to customers for products that are not eligible for coverage, where customers would only find out when filing a claim.

References

External links
 

American companies established in 1999 
Financial services companies established in 1999 
Companies based in San Francisco
2016 mergers and acquisitions
Insurance companies of the United States
1999 establishments in California
Allstate
Financial services companies based in California
American corporate subsidiaries